Horrible Histories is a British sketch comedy children's television series, the second live-action iteration of the book series Horrible Histories written by Terry Deary.

Produced by Lion Television for the CBBC, it is a revival of the previous live-action TV series, which had formally ceased production in 2013, and treated as a continuation of the show's previous incarnation beginning with "Series 6". Despite this, episodes from Series 6 and "The Specials II" utilise the Horrible Histories Special title card which the earlier series used for one-off programs.

History
In 2014, CBBC executives announced that, owing to the critical and popular success of the original, discussions were underway regarding some form of return. Original series star Mathew Baynton subsequently confirmed that he and the other five members of the starring cast would not be reuniting as a team for the new project.

The resulting series, while sharing the same core concept, genre and sensibilities as its predecessor—including an original parody song in each episode—follows a notably different format. In lieu of the previous short, unconnected sketches from randomly-selected time periods, the new series consists of specials focusing on the specific life and times of one prominent historical figure. It will also involve a largely all-new production team and cast, while still retaining Greg Jenner as lead historical consultant and many of the original series's writers. In addition, original stars Sarah Hadland, Simon Farnaby, Lawry Lewin, Dominique Moore,  Katherine Jakeways, Giles Terera and Jim Howick returned in limited roles, with Farnaby in particular reprising his role as Death. Minor Series 4 actors Jessica Ransom and Jalaal Hartley took on more central roles. Several prominent UK comedy veterans, including Ben Miller, Kathryn Drysdale, Kevin Eldon, Tom Rosenthal and Rowan Atkinson, guest-starred as the spotlighted figures.

In February 2015, the new series debuted with an episode drawing on the events leading up to the signing of Magna Carta, timed to coincide with the BBC's larger commemoration of the document's 800-year anniversary before being followed by a run of fourteen episodes. 2016 saw the broadcast of three specials to mark certain events throughout that year: 400 years since Shakespeare died, the BBC's "Love to Read" campaign, and 350 years since the Great Fire of London. There was a slight change in cast where the main stars Jalaal Hartley, Tom Stourton and Jessica Ransom continued with some of the supporting cast, while a number of the sixth series cast, including the two original members Jim Howick and Simon Farnaby were absent.

A full-length seventh series was aired every Monday on CBBC from June 2017, and it continued into 2018. Hartley, Ransom and Stourton continue alongside Gemma Whelan and Richard David-Caine who stayed on from the 2016 specials; Ryan Sampson now makes up the sixth main cast member. This time, Series 7 focuses each episode on a theme, e.g. music, explorers, medicine, presidents etc. The format is very much the same with recurring sketches, a song or two each episode (with the main songs now placed at the end of each episode, except for Ruthless Rulers and Series 8's Mind Your Manners), animated characters in-between sketches and quiz questions asked by various historical figures. One notable difference is that of host Rattus Rattus, who has his own storyline based on the theme of the episode and is appearing in many different costumes. Guest-stars include Sanjeev Bhaskar with various roles, as he did in Series 6, and First Dates host Fred Sirieix who appears for 'Historical First Dates' sketches to host.

An eighth series began filming in September 2018, and began airing on 3 June 2019 on CBBC, with a similar concept to Series 7 (each episode focusing on a theme) whilst also occasionally featuring guest co-hosts. The series had two special episodes: the first one being Football with Alex Scott, a special where  guest star footballer Alex Scott appeared and hosted her own episode and recounted skits in the show about football from seasons from the original 2009 Horrible Histories show and the sixth season of the 2015 reboot. The second special episode was aired on CBBC on 15 August 2019 – guest star, actress and comedian Emily Atack hosted her own episode called Back to School with Emily Atack. The episode consisted of her recounting skits from the original 2009 Horrible Histories and the 2015 reboot's seventh season relating to school and education.

On 19 December 2019, It was announced that the remaining episodes of series 8 will air during 2020, however a new ninth series will also be set to air sometime in the year.

In October 2022, a special episode about the history of the BBC was shown to celebrate the BBC's 100th anniversary.

Cast
Further information see: List of Horrible Histories cast members

These are the cast who have appeared in all or most of the episodes:

 Richard Atwill (2016 Specials)
Richard David-Caine (2016 Specials – present)
Simon Farnaby (Series 6)
Jalaal Hartley (Series 6 – present)
 Harrie Hayes (Series 8)
Jim Howick (Series 6)
 Samson Kayo (Series 7) 
Naz Osmanoglu (Series 6)
Jessica Ransom (Series 6 – present)
Adam Riches (Series 6)
Ryan Sampson (Series 7)
Tom Stourton (Series 6 – present)
Thom Tuck (2016 Specials)
Mike Wozniak (Series 8)
Gemma Whelan (2016 Specials – Series 7)

Supporting cast:

 Michael Abubakar (Series 8)
Lolly Adefope (Series 7)
Sanjeev Bhaskar (Series 6 – Series 7)
 Louise Ford  (Series 6 – Series 7)
Katherine Jakeways (Series 6)
Lawry Lewin (Series 6)
Jason Lewis (Series 6)
 Bhavna Limbachia (Series 6)
 Dan Li (Series 6 – Series 7)
 Emily Lloyd-Saini (Series 8)
 James McNicholas (Series 7 – Series 8)
Dominique Moore (Series 6 – 2016 Specials)
Tom Palmer (Series 7)
Daniel Lawrence Taylor (2016 Specials)
Giles Terera (Series 6)
 Danielle Vitalis (Series 8)
Natalie Walter (Series 6 – 2016 Specials)
Ellie White (Series 7 – Series 8) 
Sophie Wu (Series 6 – Series 7)

Guest starring:

Rowan Atkinson
Terry Deary
Kathryn Drysdale
Kevin Eldon
Mel Giedroyc
Miles Jupp
Ben Miller
Tom Rosenthal
Fred Sirieix (Series 7–8)
Lorna Watson
Robert Webb

Episodes

Awards

|-
| 2018
| Horrible Histories Series 7
| BAFTA Children's Award for Best Writing
| 

|-
| 2018
| Tom Stourton as Henry VIII
| BAFTA Children's Award for Best Performer
| 

|-
| 2018
| Horrible Histories Series 7
| BAFTA Children's Award for Best Comedy
| 

|-
| 2018
| Horrible Histories Series 7
| Broadcast Award for Best Children's Programme
| 

|-
| 2017
| Horrible Histories Special: Crooked King John and Magna Carta
| International Emmy Award for Best Kids Factual
| 
|-
| 2017
| Horrible Histories Special: Sensational Shakespeare
| Broadcast Award for Best Children's Programme
| 
|-
| 2016
| Horrible Histories Special: Sensational Shakespeare
| BAFTA Children's Award for Best Comedy
| 
|-
| 2016
| Tom Stourton as William Shakespeare 
| BAFTA Children's Award for Best Performer
| 
|-
| 2016
| Horrible Histories Special: Sensational Shakespeare
| BAFTA Children's Award for Best Writing
| 
|-
| 2015
| Horrible Histories Series 6
| British Comedy Guide Award for Best Sketch Show
| 
|-
| 2016
| Horrible Histories Special: Crooked King John and Magna Carta
| Kidscreen Award for Best Non-Animated or Mixed Series
| 
|-
| 2016
| Horrible Histories Special: Awesome Alfred the Great
| Broadcast Award for Best Children's Programme
| 
|-
| 2015
| Horrible Histories Special: Crooked King John and Magna Carta
| BAFTA Children's Award for Best Comedy
| 
|-
| 2015
|  Jessica Ransom as Mary, Queen of Scots
| BAFTA Children's Award for Best Performer
| 
|-
| 2015
| Horrible Histories Special: Crooked King John and Magna Carta
| BAFTA Children's Award for Best Writing
| 
|}

DVD and online releases
The series, treated as the sixth of the original 2009–2013 run, was released on Region 2 DVD on 31 August 2015. Episodes are also available online through UK iTunes as "Series 6: Rotten Rulers". The 2016 specials were released on DVD under "The Specials II" on 12 September 2016. The seventh series, including its then-unaired episodes, was released on DVD on 6 November 2017 for regions 2 and 4.

Controversies
Australian Chinese viewers claimed that the "I'm a Tang Celebrity" segment on the second episode of series 6 was "spreading institutionalised racism".

References

External links
 
 
 Q&A with cast and crew of 2015 revival
 

2010s British children's television series
2020s British children's television series
2010s British television sketch shows
2020s British television sketch shows
BBC children's television shows
BBC television sketch shows
British children's comedy television series
Horrible Histories
British television shows based on children's books
British television shows featuring puppetry
Children's sketch comedy
English-language television shows
Depictions of Julius Caesar on television
Television series by All3Media